Surfing made its debut appearance at the 2020 Summer Olympics in 2020 in Tokyo, Japan. It has also been approved by the IOC for inclusion at the 2024 Olympic Games in Paris.

Bid for inclusion
In September 2015, surfing was included in a shortlist along with baseball, softball, karate, skateboarding, and sport climbing to be considered for inclusion in the 2020 Summer Olympics. In June 2016, the executive board of the International Olympic Committee (IOC) announced that they would support the proposal to include all of the shortlisted sports in the 2020 Games. Finally, on August 3, 2016, all five sports (counting baseball and softball together as one sport) were approved for inclusion in the 2020 Olympic program.

One of the biggest obstacles for surfing to be included in the Olympics for many years was in the event of a landlocked country hosting the games which would make surfing difficult to take place, and another one was that drowning is one of the big risks in surfing, and the IOC was less likely to take high liabilities in the event of a death.

Events

2020

Medalists

Medal table
Sources:

References

External links
Surfing at tokyo2020.org

 
Sports at the Summer Olympics
Summer Olympics
Surfing competitions